Owl is a three piece Los Angeles-based hard rock band.  Led by vocalist/bassist Chris Wyse, the long-time bassist for the Cult and a member of Ace Frehley's band, Owl released their eponymous debut in 2009 and their second album, The Right Thing, in 2013.

History 

Wyse began playing bass while in grade school in upstate New York.   As a teenager, he met drummer Dan Dinsmore, then 17; shortly thereafter, they began playing together in a local band, East Wall.  After touring regionally, Wyse, who had garnered national attention as a bass player,  moved to Los Angeles, while Dinsmore remained in Albany, joining the industrial rock band The Clay People.

Wyse's success came quickly in Los Angeles, where he played with Guns N' Roses' Chris Pitman, Tool's Paul D'Amour, Tal Bachman, Mick Jagger, Scott Weiland, and Ozzy Osbourne  before joining the Cult in 2006.   Dinsmore's band also achieved significant success, particularly with the single Awake, from the Strangeland soundtrack  which hit #1 on the metal charts.  When the Clay People went on hiatus in 2001, Dinsmore continued his career as a drummer, playing with producer Mike Clink, known for his work with Metallica, among others.

In 2002, Wyse met guitarist Jason Achilles Mezilis through a mutual friend.  A classically trained pianist, Mezilis had recently graduated from the University of California, Berkeley with a Bachelor of Arts in Music.  After graduation, he interned at several prominent recording studios and played guitar with Los Angeles bands, including Your Horrible Smile. In 2011, Mezilis founded Organic Audio Recorders,  a boutique analog & digital recording studio in downtown Los Angeles.

An early version of Owl was formed in 2001 to recorded a cover of "Behind The Sun" for the record Flammable: A Tribute To the Red Hot Chili Peppers. In reviewing the album, All Music Guide wrote "Owl's version of "Behind the Sun" is appropriately trippy, and even replicates Flea's dominating bassline with aplomb."

In 2007, Wyse, Mezilis and Dinsmore once again came together as Owl.  Although Wyse occasionally performed on the upright bass with the Cult, with Owl, it became his trademark; playing with a bow, and using delays and sound effects techniques, Wyse uses the bass as a lead instrument. In a 2013 interview, Wyse responded to a question regarding the motivation behind the group. "There would be no other format like this unless I created it. When I was a kid people used to say "you can't play bass like that!," he stated. "Rock music is not supposed to have rules. That's the whole point. As soon as I hear about all the rules a band has I get turned off because they are worried about being cool and not a being vibrant artist. I don't want to fit into anyone's idea. I want to show you new ones."  Wyse, who is also Owl's main songwriter and vocalist, produced Owl's self-titled debut, which was recorded at Matt Sorum's Drac Studios in Los Angeles and released in 2009.  The band supported the record, which was described as a "swirling epic,"  through a video for the track "Pusher"  and through live performances, including shows with Helmet, Jet, In This Moment and Hollywood All Star rock collective Camp Freddy.

Owl began writing what would become the band's self-produced album The Right Thing in early 2011, recording at Matt Sorum's Drac Studios in Los Angeles.  In addition, Owl recorded at Overit Studios in upstate New York, a studio Dinsmore opened in conjunction with Overit Media, a media and marketing company he founded in 1993. Deemed a "no nonsense hard rock album with stadium sized hooks," The Right Thing was released on April 9, 2013, on Overit Records  and Magnetic Eye Records as a joint release.  The first video from the album, "The Right Thing,"premiered on Rolling Stone's website; it was followed by "Destroyer" and "Perfect."

A third album, Things You Can't See, was released in the summer of 2015. Bass Player wrote it was Owl's  "boldest and most experimental album." A video for the song "Lake Ego" was released in 2017.  It was followed by a performance video for the title track in 2018.

Discography

Albums 
2015 Things You Can't See Overit Records 
2013 The Right Thing Overit Records, Magnetic Eye Records (vinyl edition only)
2009 Owl  Overit Records

Compilations 

2002  "Behind the Sun" from Flammable: A Tribute to the Red Hot Chili Peppers

Videography 
Things You Can't See 2018
Lake Ego 2017
Who's Gonna Save You Now 2015
The Right Thing 2013
Destroyer 2013
Perfect  2013
Pusher 2009

External links 
 Official Website

References 

Hard rock musical groups from California
Musical groups from Los Angeles
Musical groups established in 2007